Ángel Flisfisch Fernández (1941–2022) was a Chilean diplomat lawyer, researcher, and politician. He held various relevant positions during the administrations of the Concertación de Partidos por la Democracia governed the country between 1990 and 2010. He served as Undersecretary of Foreign Affairs of Chile from 2009 to 2010 and Ambassador of Chile in Singapore.

Education
He studied law at the University of Chile and did postgraduate studies in political science at the Latin American Faculty of Social Sciences (FLACSO) and at the University of Michigan, where he obtained a master's degree in political science.

Career
He served as Undersecretary of Aviation, Under Secretary of the Navy, and Under Secretary for Foreign Affairs. He also held the position of  Secretary Pro Tempore of the Union of South American Nations (UNASUR), and Director of Planning of the Foreign Affairs. At the academic level, he was director of FLACSO in Santiago and a member of the Board of Directors of Universidad Diego Portales. He also published in the Center for Sociological Research (CIS) and the Center for Public Studies (CEP).

Publications
Studies on the party system in Chile. 
Consensus, pact, project, and democratic stability.
Politics as a democratic commitment. 
Conceptual models of politics. 
Intellectuals and institutions of culture.
Parties and Democracy.
Chilean Neoliberalism: the functions of dogmatism.
The spirit of democratic capitalism

References

Chilean politicians
Chilean diplomats
1941 births
2022 deaths